KRCY-FM (96.7 FM, "Krazy FM") is a radio station broadcasting a classic hits format. Licensed to Lake Havasu City, Arizona, United States, the station serves the Laughlin, Nevada, area. The station is currently owned by Murphy Broadcasting and licensed to Rick L. Murphy. Much of the playlist is derived from Westwood One's "Classic Hits" satellite feed.

History
The station was assigned the call letters KANG on 1998-07-17. On 1999-01-15, the station changed its call sign to KBBC-FM, and on 2003-01-30 to the current KRCY-FM.

Translators

References

External links
 Murphy Broadcasting
 

RCY-FM
RCY-FM
Classic hits radio stations in the United States
Lake Havasu City, Arizona
Radio stations established in 1998